Närke and Värmland County was the earlier name of Örebro County in Sweden, between 1634 and 1779. In that year Värmland ceded to form Värmland County. Since Närke only corresponded the southern part of the remaining territory and the name was changed to reflect the city where the Governor resided, namely Örebro.

See also about Sweden
 Counties of Sweden
 Provinces of Sweden
 List of Örebro Governors

Former counties of Sweden
1634 establishments in Sweden